Meerut City, or Meerut City Junction, is the main railway station in the city of Meerut. It is a junction of Meerut–Bulandshahr–Khurja  line and Delhi–Meerut–Saharanpur line. Double lining of Meerut–Saharanpur section is on full swing.

It lies on the Northern Railway zone of India under Delhi division.

History 

This station was established by British India government in 1911. It lies on the Delhi to Haridwar/Dehradun line.

Lines and routes 
It is a junction of Meerut–Bulandshahr–Khurja lines (93 km) that goes via Hapur Jn and connect to Kolkata–Delhi line, and Delhi–Meerut–Saharanpur line. Delhi to Meerut City is double-line and electrified while Meerut–Saharanpur section is single-electrified line. Doubling of Meerut–Saharanpur section is on full swing.

Survey has been done and line is to be laid from Daurala station in Meerut to Bijnor. The cities which are expected to be included in the route are Daurala, Mawana, Hastinapur, Bahsuma and Daranagar.

Trains 
A total of 78 trains halt at Meerut City Jn railway station. 8 trains originate from and terminate at Meerut City. Sangam Express, Nauchandi Express, Rajya Rani Express are originating trains which goes to Allahabad via Bulandshahr–Aligarh–Kanpur, Allahabad via Bareilly–Lucknow and Bareilly–Lucknow respectively. Three Khruja–Meerut Passenger trains shuttle between Meerut and Khurja and 1 train Umbala Passenger and  Passenger also originate from Meerut City. About 60 trains run up and down to Delhi, Mumbai, Madurai, Kochuvelli, Amritsar, Jammu Tawi, Okha, Bilaspur, Puri, Indore, Ujjain daily, biweekly or weekly.

After Meerut City, the second major railway station is Meerut Cantonment, located 4 km North.

Infrastructure 
The station is equipped with route relay interlocking technology for managing tracks and signalling. The rail yard has 2 washing lines for maintenance or train rakes. It has also got a coach care facility with capacity of 2 coaches.

Station also has a dedicated cargo siding for freight loading and unloading. The siding has 3 zones: open siding for coal, cement, fertilizer etc., a petroleum terminal bay of BPCL and, a closed siding terminal for all other type of goods. The siding is located about 1.9 km east of the station.

Amenities 
City railway station is a Class-A railway station of Norther Railway. It is equipped with most public amenities like restaurants, waiting room, retiring room, police station, post office etc. The station is fully disabled friendly. Escalators and elevators are being installed for easing passenger movement between platform 1 and 2–3. PNB and SBI ATMs are also available at station entrance.

Station premises also have a Railway Hospital for railway staff.

Gallery

References

Delhi railway division
Northern Railway zone
Railway junction stations in Uttar Pradesh
Transport in Meerut
Buildings and structures in Meerut
Railway stations in Meerut